Scopula agutsaensis is a moth of the family Geometridae. It was described by Vasilenko in 1997. It is found in Russia (Transbaikal).

References

Moths described in 1997
Moths of Asia
agutsaensis